Lunenburg Courthouse Historic District is a historic courthouse building and national historic district located at the village of Lunenberg, Lunenburg County, Virginia. The courthouse was built in 1827, and is a two-story, three bay, brick temple-form building fronted by a tetrastyle Roman Doric order portico.  It is six bays deep with two of the bays added in an expansion in 1939. Associated with the courthouse was a large, hipped-roofed frame house which was once an inn known as the Lunenburg State Inn.

The oldest structure within the Courthouse Historic District is a building built in 1799 called Rosewood, and has since operated as a tavern, judge's house, residence, inn, post office, store and is now a cafe and tea room. The architecture design was based on the colony to nation period of architecture in Lunenburg County, and retains many of its original features such as the building structure, period fireplaces and wooden flooring and beams.

The historic district was listed on the National Register of Historic Places in 1972.

References

Courthouses on the National Register of Historic Places in Virginia
County courthouses in Virginia
Historic districts on the National Register of Historic Places in Virginia
Government buildings completed in 1827
Buildings and structures in Lunenburg County, Virginia
National Register of Historic Places in Lunenburg County, Virginia
1827 establishments in Virginia